The Microcerberidae are a family of isopod crustaceans.

Marine microcerberids comprise the main part species diversity, but are very alike. As a group, they have very broad distribution:
the majority of Coxicerberus: Americas, southern coasts of Europe, Africa, warm waters of Asia, New Zealand
"Microcerberus" monodi: Angola
Freshwater taxa are less abundant in species number (only 12 species), but are more morphologically diverse and include seven or eight genera. They have these distributions:
Afrocerberus and Protocerberus: central and southern Africa
Bulgarocerberus: Bulgaria
Isoyvesia: Cuba
Mexicerberus: Mexico
Microcerberus: South Carolina, Romania, Bulgaria and Macedonia
"Microcerberus" remyi: Morocco
Coxicerberus ruffoi: northern Italy

References

Isopoda
Taxa named by Stanko Karaman
Crustacean families
Taxa described in 1933